Badi Panthulu is a 1972 Indian Telugu-language drama film, produced by P. Perraju under the Triveni Productions banner and directed by P. Chandrasekhara Reddy. It stars N. T. Rama Rao and Anjali Devi, with music composed by K. V. Mahadevan. It is a remake of the Kannada film School Master (1958). The film was released on 22 November 1972 and became a commercial success, with Rama Rao winning the Filmfare Award for Best Actor – Telugu.

Plot
Raghava Rao, a noble school teacher, leads a happy family life with his ideal wife Janaki, two sons, and a daughter. Raghava Rao is transferred to his native village as a headmaster where he notices the children are completely undisciplined. He struggles hard and makes them straight including an impish boy Ramu who becomes his admirer and designates their school as ideal. Eventually, Raghava Rao's presence becomes a hurdle to the trespasses of school committee president Papa Rao, a fraudulent person. So, he sets fire to Raghava Rao's house when the school children unite together and built a house showing their adoration towards him. Years roll by, and Raghava Rao's children Satyam, Venu, and Lakshmi grew up, for their education, Raghava Rao forcibly takes a loan from Papa Rao. But they are not fair, Satyam marries Papa Rao's daughter Shanthi and Venu marries a rich girl Jaya without their parents' knowledge. After that, Raghava Rao strives hard, makes the marriage arrangements with a guy Pichaiah (Raja Babu), son of a miser Panakalu and for the expenses, hostages his house. During the time of marriage, Papa Rao lands and demands his debt, to keep up his honor Raghava Rao gives away the dowry amount. Learning it, Panakalu tries to stop the marriage, heretofore, it is completed. So, he takes a promissory note instead of a dowry and does not allow the couple to live together. Now the Raghava Rao couple is left alone, moreover, he retires when they have no other alternative except to live with their children. But their ungrateful children split the couple and leave the house for debts. Papa Rao brings it to auction when Ramu the old student of Raghava Rao purchases it. Meanwhile, the couple endures the separation, as well as horrible treatment from their children. Above Papa Rao reaches his daughter's house, attributes theft to Raghava Rao which he could not tolerate, and leaves the place. On the other side, Janakamma also abuses her daughter-in-law & her mother, so, she too proceeds. Both of them meet at the railway station, by that time, Papa Rao gives a police complaint, and Raghava Rao been arrested. Fortunately, there, Ramu appears as Police Officer who orders his men to take them to their village. Parallelly, Venu & Satyam realize their mistake, even Pichaiah teaches a lesson to his father, accompanies Lakshmi and all of them travel toward their parents. Therein, the Raghava Rao couple is surprised to see themselves in their house where Ramu gifts it to his beloved teacher. At last, Raghava Rao's children also arrive and seek their pardon. Finally, the movie ends on a happy note with the reunion of the entire family.

Cast
N. T. Rama Rao as Head Master Raghava Rao
Anjali Devi as Janaki
Krishnam Raju as Venu
Ramakrishna as Satyam
Jaggayya as Ramu
Nagabhushanam as Papa Rao 
Allu Ramalingaiah as Panakalu
Raja Babu as Pichaiah
Mikkilineni as Collector
Dr. Sivaramakrishnaiah as Doctor
Raavi Kondala Rao as Kanthaiah
Suryakantham as Rajamma
Sowcar Janaki as Radha
Vijayalalitha as Jaya
Jayanthi as Shanthi
Radha Kumari as Panakalu's wife
T. Padmini as Lakshmi
Master Adinarayana as Young Ramu 
Baby Sridevi as Raghava Rao's granddaughter

Production
Badi Panthulu is a remake of the 1958 Kannada film School Master (1958), itself based on the Marathi novel Vaishnavi by Kusumagraj.

Soundtrack

Music composed by K. V. Mahadevan.

Release and reception
Badi Panthulu was released on 22 November 1972 and was a commercial success. For his performance, Rama Rao won the Filmfare Award for Best Actor – Telugu.

References

External links
 

1972 films
1970s Telugu-language films
Indian black-and-white films
Telugu remakes of Kannada films
Films scored by K. V. Mahadevan
Films based on adaptations
Films directed by P. Chandrasekhara Reddy